Tonight is the fourth full-length solo album by Christian hip hop artist TobyMac. It is the follow-up album to his 2007 release Portable Sounds, and was released on February 9, 2010. The Deluxe Version of the album contains a DVD with interviews with Toby about the songs on the record, the making of this record and an inside look at the Diverse City Band. The album debuted at No. 6 on the Billboard 200, selling 79,000 units in its first week. As of early November 2010, the album has sold over 315,000 copies.

Recording 

When asked about the album by stereotruth.net Toby had the following to say about the emotions that went into producing it; "The recording process means a lot to me, and I don't approach what I do haphazardly. I have a lot of passion when it comes to my records. I don't know if it's good or bad, but there's this range of emotions that come with making a record. Music is something that can actually open people’s minds to who God is. Music will never change the world, but God can choose to use music, and that's what I count on. I want my songs to be said in a way that anyone can relate to them. I want them to move people's lives forward; move people toward God, and if I'm accomplishing that, whether or not anyone loves this record, as long as I feel like that is what I’m doing, then I feel like my job is done."

Singles 

"City on Our Knees" was released as the lead single from the album on August 14, 2009. It peaked at No. 1 on Billboards Hot Christian Songs chart.

On January 26, 2010, "Get Back Up" was released as the album's second single. The song also peaked at No. 1 on Billboards Hot Christian Songs chart. He donated 100% of his artist royalties from first week sales of the single to relief efforts for Haiti after the earthquake that devastated the country.

The third single from the album, "Hold On", was released on October 19, 2010.

"Tonight" was released as the fourth single on March 21, 2011. It was used as the theme for MLB Network's spring training team preview show, 30 Clubs in 30 Days, as well as being used in a commercial for America's Got Talent. A music video for the song was released on February 8, 2010.

Both "Start Somewhere" and "Changed Forever" impacted Christian radio as the fifth and sixth singles from the album on October 10, 2011.

Other songs 

"Showstopper" was used as a part of the NFL Thursday Night Football promotional material, and the 2009 World Series. It also has been the official theme song for the WWE Fatal 4-Way Pay-Per View event, and the song was also promoted for ESPY's Best US Male Olympian. "Showstopper" and "Funky Jesus Music" were both premiered at the Winter Wonder Slam 09 Tour. "Funky Jesus Music" was included on the "Hits Deep Live" album. On "Hits Deep Live" when TobyMac tells the crowd to say, "Ola Ola Eh" this is a reference to the song Sweet Dreams (La Bouche song) by La Bouche.

Accolades

The album won a Dove Award for Rock/Contemporary Album of the Year at the 42nd GMA Dove Awards. The songs "Get Back Up", "Tonight" and "Showstopper" were also nominated.

Track listing 

Notes
  signifies a remixer.

Personnel 

 Toby McKeehan - vocals, guitars, programming, keyboards
 Christopher Stevens - guitars, programming, keyboards, drums, background vocals
 David Wyatt - programming, keys
 Cary Barlowe - guitars, acoustic guitar, background vocals
 Tim Rosenau - guitars, trumpet
 Jesse Frasure - programming, keyboards, background vocals
 Brian Haley - drums
 Justin York - guitars
 Tony Lucido - bass
 Byron "Mr. TalkBox" Chambers - talkbox
 Jamie Moore - keyboards, programming
 Wendell Henry - drums
 John Cooper - background vocals on "Tonight"
 Paul Moak - electric guitar
 Michael Ripoll - guitars
 Mike Payne - guitar, banjo, electric guitar
 Israel Houghton - background vocals on "Break Open the Sky"
 Taylor Stevens - piano
 Adam Nitti - bass
 DJ Maj - DJ
 Sammy Sylvester - bass, electric guitar
 Leif Shires - trumpet
 Craig Swift - saxophone
 Kenn Hughes - trombone
 Nirva Dorsaint-Ready - background vocals
 Gabriel Patillo - background vocals
 Jason Eskridge - background vocals
 Siti Monroe - background vocals
 Matthew Thiessen - background vocals on "Wonderin'"
 Ayiesha Woods - background vocals
 Jovaun Woods - background vocals

Charts

Weekly charts

Year-end charts

Certifications

References 

TobyMac albums
ForeFront Records albums
2010 albums
Albums produced by TobyMac